The Elephant Butte Irrigation District is a  historic district in New Mexico and Texas which was listed on the National Register of Historic Places in 1997.  The listing included three contributing buildings and 214 contributing structures, in Doña Ana County, New Mexico, Sierra County, New Mexico and El Paso County, Texas..

It preserves portions of the Rio Grande Project, a U.S. Bureau of Reclamation project which distributes water of the upper Rio Grande River.

It is in the area of Las Cruces, New Mexico.  The district runs roughly along U.S. Route 85 between its junction with New Mexico State Road 90 and the El Paso, Texas city limits.

See also
Farm and Ranch Heritage Museum, Las Cruces.

References

Irrigation districts
Irrigation projects		
Buildings and structures completed in 1906
National Register of Historic Places in Doña Ana County, New Mexico
National Register of Historic Places in Sierra County, New Mexico
National Register of Historic Places in El Paso County, Texas
1906 establishments in the United States